The Ciechocinek Formation (also known as the Gryfice Formation at Suliszewo), known in Germany as the Green Series (German: Grüne Serie)  is a Jurassic (lower Toarcian) geologic formation that extends across the Baltic coast, from Grimmen, Germany, to Lithuania, with its major sequence in Poland and a few boreholes in Kaliningrad. It is mostly known by its diverse entomofauna, composed of more than 150 species of different groups of insects, as well its marine vertebrate fossils, including remains of sharks, actinopterygians and marine reptiles, along terrestrial remains of dinosaurs, including the early thyreophoran Emausaurus and others not yet assigned to a definite genus. Its exposures are mostly derived from active clay mining of a dislocated glacial raft with exposed Upper Pliensbachian to late Toarcian shallow-marine sediments. Starting with coarse and fine sand deposits with concretions, the pure clay of the Ciechocinek Formation, after the falciferum zone, was deposited in a restricted basin south of the Fennoscandian mainland. It hosts a layer full of carbonate concretions, where a great entomofauna is recovered.

The Ciechocinek Formation is the sister unit of the Sorthat Formation of Bornholm, being its frontal brackish system (measured thanks to the presence of phyllopods and absence of Echinoderms and other stenohaline invertebrates), and the Lava Formation of Lithuania (that represents a more brackish setting at the east), a foreshore setting of the deltaic/lagoonar depositions of the Sorthat, located at the south of this last one, and sharing material between both due to the presence of a measured deltaic system that developed between the two units. The Ciechocinek Formation was, in the late Toarcian a depositional area located north-eastern margin of the North German Basin, where the Sorthat Formation (Bornholm high, Fennoscandinavian coast) and the northern part of the island of Rügen (Ringkøbing-Fyn High), both to the north, provided the terrestrial elements of the Ciechocinek Formation taphocoenosis. The Posidonia Shale, deposited mostly on nearby deeper parts of this basin interfinger with the Ciechocinek Fm in the western parts of the states of Mecklenburg-Western Pomerania and Brandenburg. Its main equivalents are the Posidonia Shale, upper part of the Rydeback Member, Rya Formation (Southern Sweden), the Fjerritslev Formation (Danish Basin), the Sorthat Formation (Bornholm) or the Lava Formation (Lithuania). There are also coeval abandoned informal units in Poland: Gryfice Beds (Now fused with the Ciechocinek, Pomerania region), Lower Łysiec beds (Częstochowa region), or the "Estheria series".

History 

The clay pits of Dobbertin have been expoited in the past, being the most famous being the Schwinzer Hellberg clay pit. This clay layer appear on the northeastern slope of Hellberg, and was first found and excavated out in 1879 by the Rostock geologist Eugen Geinitz, and being recognized as such. The sediments of the Ciechocinek Fm in Grimmen where found in 1873. The mined clay of Klein Lehmhagen and Dobbertin was used as an addictive for concrete production. The first fossils, mostly ammonites (that allowed a more precise datation) and insects where recovered in 1894, where Geinitz related the local finds with the southern liassic shales that he studied at the same time, yet he was surprised about the abundance of phyllopods and coeloptera elytrons in the sediments, suggesting a more freshwater/terrestrial influence. Latter, using the ammonites as a reference, it was established in 1909 that the Grimmen Pits were different, but the regional equivalent of the, present in mostly southern Germany and pelagic, Posidonia Shale (being both liassic in age). Also, some of the sediments were vinculated with finds of the Lias of Bornholm (Moslty the Hasle Formation). In 1954 a first drill process was done in Ciechocinek, where the geology of the zone was related to Jurassic sedimentation, although a concrete datation beyond lias was not possible. That first drilled borehole would become latter the main pit of the Formation. It wasn't until 1958, when the eminent Geologist Stefan Zbigniew Różycki proposed the name Ciechocinek Series, that was left temporally as an informal unit. Różycki was the first to study in-depth the strata recovering the formation, that he called "Seria Ciechocińska" (Ciechocinek Series), and report a structure based on clay rocks, represented by mudstones, claystones, and shales with the find of clays with quite a high kaolin content. It also does the first comparation with the slightly younger Seria borucicka (Borurice Beds), and estimate that the rocks were approximately of Late Liassic in age, with the possibility of finding Dogger Sediments on the uppermost parts. Also, suggests that they were analogue to the Ostrowiec series of Świętokrzyskie Mountains. Studies on the region found that the Clay sediments found in Grimmen had a wider distribution on the surrounding areas, which led to the opening of a Klay Pit near Klein Lehmhagen in between 1959 and 1961. After that year, the pit extension grown, allowing to study it deeper and have detailed insights into its sedimentology, as well in the Dobbertin pit, being both compared in depth. It was found that this strata had depth and clear glacial deformation, with several layers displaced as effect of glacial erratics. Ammonites found on the layers of Dobbertin where identified as Pliensbachian in age, yet it was proven that they were Toarcian ammonites latter. Later works use the name Ciechocinek Series for the Polish Basin sediments, doing studies about sedimentology on the layers already Drilled, or founding new Boreholes with similar composition of Kaolinite and related materials. Was in the 1960s, when the name "Formazaja Ciechocińska" was first suggested, at the same time the stratigraphy of the formation led to exclude Middle Jurassic Strata, being linked now in first instance to the Posidonia Shale of Germany. At this time, the Kaolinitic content was related to a depositional setting based on a large deltaic succession, and compared to large modern rivers, suggesting a tropical climate for the formation. In the late 1970s was recovered as the Toarcian succession of the Polish Basin, linked in age to the Posidonia Shale and to the deposits of Dobbertin and Grimmen of the same age. The presence of the Posidonia Shale in the German realm was quoted until the 90's, yet this deposit is dominated by siderites & mudstone and the true Posidonia Shale is limited to southern pelagic deposits. The clay pits of Grimmen and Dobbertin ended with different destiny: the first one was closed in 1995, and has filled with freshwater since 2002. The Dobbertin pit however, has been under protection as a geological natural monument since 1991, as the exposed layers are considered an exceptional land–sea facies distribution during the Toarcian and also its international fame, due to its wealth of fossils from the northern margin of Fennoscandia. In the 2000s the greatest part of the work on the Formation was done, studying its geology, stratigraphy and sedimentation. The German layers  where on several recent works classified as part of the Ciechocinek Formation.

Toarcian material found in glacial Erratics in Ahrensburg and the Hagen Forest has been in controversy doue to its dubious origin, being linked with the Rya Formation and Sorthat Formation, as well this unit. They were originally considered or local or Baltic in derivation, but that changued with the recovery of erratic concretions in the Baltic sea cliffs near Lübeck, being found as part of the Weichselian Glacial Maximum. Liassic–Cretaceous sediments in the assemblage are most probably associated with the tectonic Sorgenfrei–Tornquist Zone. The origin of this erratics from southwestern Baltic, Poland or Danish archipelago is unlikely, as those zones are dominated by Late Cretaceous–Paleocene strata, suggesting that this Toarcian assamblages should come from south/SW between STZ–TTZ and the German Baltic coast. The most clear hint link this deposits with the Ciechocinek Fm, as they're identical in fauna and facies composition of Grimmen and Dobbertin, also affected by subglacial erosion and thrusting, suggesting a close stratigraphic and palaeogeographical origin.

Lithology

The Ciechocinek is composed mostly by muds and silts, along with poorly consolidated Mudstones and Siltstones with lenses and subordinate intercalations of fine-grained sandy lenses, typically from 1 mm to less 20 cm thick, extended a few meters, along also with sandstones. Diagenetic siderite intercalations and concretions, around 20 cm thick, as well as pyrite concretions are also present. The lithology of the Pits consists mostly on  gray-yellow and red-brown clay marl follow over pyrite and gypsum-bearing clay stones of the upper part of the formation strata, that have abundant "marl" concretions, called "Amaltheentone". The mineralization  of siderite occurs in all types of Ciechocinek Formation deposits. Include fine crystalline variety, coarse crystalline rhombohedra and fine crystalline aggregates impregnated by a mixture of undetermined iron hydroxides. The mineralization of the siderites on certain layers is associated to the abundance of organic matter, with the decay of it ending on a progressive carbonate supersaturation, with an early precipitation on the nucleus of the siderites. They reflect also the conditions of salinity on the water, showing variances in short periods, associated with the abundance of organic matter. Siderite spherulites have also been recorded on heaps near Kuraszków and also single spherulites or groups of several appear in the Brody-Lubienia borehole among the light gray mudstone. The strata is filled with mostly marine fauna in the German realm, Belemnites, Bivalves, Gastropods, whose hard parts become lithified and part of the deposited grains. There is silty to fine sand and weakly carbonatic, nica-bearing facies at the southernmost point. The lithology of the layers is dominated by claystone and clay, along very fossiliferous mudstones, brown cemented sands, siltstone, sandstone and coarse to very sorted sands on the lowermost and uppermost levels. Deeper lithological evaluation subdivided lithology into sections of greenish to grey coarse sand, argillaceous silt with dark clay streaks and fusain (charcoal) particles, dark clay layers with lenticular lamination, limestone concretions with calcitic core and sideritic mantle, pyrite concretions and finally the pure greenish clay layers. Muds and mudstones consist mainly of particles with the size of common clay, some with an admixture of silt; sandy muds and mudstones are also encountered in counterpart to the pure clays and claystones, without admixtures of other fractions, that are rare or extremely rare. Mudstones are poorly consolidated, tend to disintegration, swell and become plastic, being the only exceptional ones those the heavy sideritic mudstones, that range from a wide variety of colors, from  brown or cherry-red in colour, with an olive shade often appearing. On the other hand, there are abundant poorly consolidated quartz sandstones, that are regularly intercalated with silt and siltstone. Along the sandstones, there are chlorite and kaolinite grains. Plant microremains are common, concentrated with mica flakes on lamination planes, while larger wood fragments, several centimeters long, are also moderately frequent. Heavy minerals are present and include as the most common euhedral forms such as zircon, rutile and tourmaline, along with angular fragments of rutile, garnet and staurolite, with finally well-rounded oval grains of zircon, rutile, garnet and tourmaline. Outside the main heavy minerals, it is possible to find well-rounded grains of green hornblende, apatite, disthene, epidote, and finally on one study one pyroxene grain was found.  With the exception of thin limestone layers, mostly are cemented.  Other minerals found include illite, quartz, calcite, feldspar and smectite, as well in less extent Charcoal. There is also a high content and proportion of unstable heavy minerals (pyrolusite, manganite, birnessite, todorokite and rhodochrosite) in the Toarcian clays, that indicate basaltic volcanism sediments, translated probably from nearest inland strata, such as the coeval Djupadal Formation. The local vulcanism started in the late Pliensbachian, and extends along the North Sea and mostly from southern Sweden. At this time, the Central Skåne Volcanic Province and the Egersund Basin expulsed most of his strata, with influences on the local tectonics. The Egersund Basin has abundant fresh porphyritic nephelinite lavas and dykes of lower Jurassic Age, with a composition nearly equal to those found on the clay pits. That reveals the translation of strata from the continental margin by large fluvial channels, that ended on the sea deposits of the Ciechocinek Formation as they are present on the Sorthat Formation. The three-dimensional clay of the Ciechocinek Formation probably originated as the weathering product of this, as seen in the Djupadal Formation. The volcanic activity very likely eroded the underlying Hettangian-Sinemurian layers of the Höör Sandstone, deposited on the Fennoscandian coast as result of the weathering of the Precambrian-Paleozoic. This is seen as, after the increased amount of clays with abundant volcanic materials, sands were repeatedly poured into the North German Basin from Skåne, as result of the erosion of the Höör sandstone. The presence of kaolinite, related to continental formation in tropical climate environments for the chemical weathering of different igneous, metamorphic and sedimentary rocks, along with chlorite and biotite, suggest a deposition linked to fluvial and deltaic forces. The eastern Sudetes and their foreland are the best candidates to be the origin of the transported material, as they have a nearly identical composition, being the Lower Jurassic deposits in the Fore-Sudetic Monocline linked Cracow-Czêstochowa Monocline, with the strata of the Formation.

Stratigraphy
The Dobbertin & Grimmen Clay Pits are the main ones, and are exposed lower Jurassic layers where the strata has been dislocated due to recent glacial activity. The basal layers of the unit are overlaying the latest Pliensbachian local exposures, that is composed mostly by coarse to fine grey and green sands and sandstones, derived from a marginal marine setting, with echinoderms and abundance of stenohaline fauna. Layers transition in the uppermost part of this level from sands to clay, indicating a change of the deposition environment, thought to be on a restricted basin. The proper layers of the unit start with a hiatus, jumping to the tenuicostum subzone of the lower Toarcian, that is built also coarse- to fine-grained sand of shallow-marine origin along carbonate concretions with the ammonite Lobolytoceras siemensi indicating its reach until the semicelatum subzone. Then, layers become dominated by clay, with an initial level of layers with abundant small concretions (elegantulum subzone), rarely if sizes up to 10 cm, and that has yielded the ammonite Harpoceras exaratum, corroborating its reach into the exaratum subzone. At the upper section, the Ciechocinek Formation clay turns into layers dominated by fine sand, indicating a reduction of the sea level due to a regression. These layers were originally dated as Falciferum subzone, but later works found them to come from the traditional late Toarcian, thus Bifrons-Thouarcense subzones. These layers correlate with erratic boulders found all over North German Basin, and are called Grätensandstein layers, and are in the Ciechocinek Formation composed by light gray fine sandstones deposited on wavy layers, with fragment remnants of teleosts  and shell remains of mussels (probably Pseudomytiloides sp.). These sandstones developed as carbonate-cemented concretions within the loose sands. These sands are the result of the erosion of the Höör layers from Skåne and host a greater amount of wood and limonite imprints than any other layer, and as well shows the presence of flow channels, and some can be interpreted as channel fillings. Overall these finds are correlated with the Great Deltaic system that developed on the North German basin, with sands and sandstones being derived on the Ciechocinek Formation as a lateral deposition of the initial extensions of the delta front, increased on the Thouarcense subzone, where rather large fluvial channels can be seen at least on Grimmen, as well the correlated evolution of the sediments is seen in the Gt Schwerin borehole.

The "Estheria Series" (Polish: "Seria Esteriowa") was an informal unit named in  the 1950s on the Holy Cross Mountains (Świętokrzyskie Voivodeship), and was named due to the abundance of Phyllopods of the genus Euestheria (At the time Estheria, now taken by an insect). This Series is composed by mudstones and sandstone, with its characteristic Brackish-freshwater fauna dominated by the genus Euestheria. On places like the Płońsk 1 Borehole appears on depths of 1869 to 1934 m, composed by suspended sandstones and quartz with coal and gray lenses, clayey buds and shat-green mudstone. Other profiles, like the Boża Wola borehole at 731.3-852.0 m the "Estheria Subunit" is composed by white sandstones, fine and medium-grained, slightly firm, gray claystones below greenish and gray and mule trees dark gray with light fine-grained sandstones with numerous charred flora. The Boreholes at Lidzbark Warmiński and Polessk in between Poland and Kalliningrad, show the strata of this subunit: at a depth of 827 m (with some researchers including from 806 to 900 m of "Estheria Subunit") recovering its fluvial-derived layers, composed by sandstones that are covered by the Middle Jurassic layers. This section covers from Lithuania to Masuria, and shows a gradual transition from the east to the west from limnic deposits to brackish, where on the Lower Toarcian the zone was drained as shown by the deposition of Bald Sandstones, and was later  flooded back at maximum spread of the Dogger marine transgression. The limnic "Estheria Subunit" is common on the Polish Lowlands, and is known by its composition of reddish-yellow Sandstone, Muscovite in abundance and brown and yellow iron irons. On the Warszawa IG-1 Borehole and Stara Iwiczna drill cores the subunit appears at  1,639.3 - 1,738.9 m, and is composed by green-gray mudstone, sandstones, mules and clayey interlining, sometimes laminated, gray and mottled, where the limit between the Lower Toarcian and the Middle Jurassic isn't clear. At the drill core of Przysucha, this subunit has approx. 7.5 m of sandstone, that is deposited following the sedimentation of the Ciechocinek Formation parallel until the nearby Kujawy. Here arenaceous facies are common, and located specially on the boreholes of Zakościele and Dąbrówka, being here the dominant strata a sandstone complex with inserts and lateral mudstones from a more humid deposit, while in Zakościtel and Sielec the sandstones cover all the level.

The Estheria Series was first recovered in 1951 on the vicinity of Żarnów (and was later found in Wąsosz and  Kuraszków), as a unit with series of green mudstones with characteristic siderite inserts, paleosols with abundant roots, plants fragments and associated coals, as well abundant ichnofossils and phyllopods of the genus Euestheria sp., and was assigned to the informal Żarnów series until Samsonowicz  described in 1954 the Ciechocinek series, where it discovered not only the identical lithology but also that both shared the species Euestheria minuta and Euestheria brodieana. Despite the coincidence, the Estheria Series was named and was informally linked with the Zarzecka series from the Świętokrzyskie region. This view was widely accepted for a long time, until thanks to the finds on the Mechowo IG I borehole, Irena Jurkiewicz stablished that this series was the equivalent of the Ciechocinek series and the Green series. Two sections are part of this sub unit, the called Esterium (green) and the lower series Podesteriowa (pod-green). This series is composed by mudstones and sandstones with overfills of fine-grained sandstones, sometimes even medium-grained and siderite inserts in the form of siderite mudstones or brown in color or sandstones impregnated with siderite. In addition, iron spherulites appear here, occurring in some levels in mass. These rocks contain a lot mica, mostly muscovite.  In the area of Wyżyna Krakowsko-Częstochowska there is abundant the microfauna represented by Ammodiscus glumaceus, A. orbis, A. cf. orbis, Trochammina sp., Haplophragmoides sp., Glomospira sp. and Lenticulina sp. along with also mussels here, unfortunately due to the poor state of preservation not determinate (Probably Modiolus sp.). The Paxitriletes phyllicus megaspore is found in great numbers.

Depositional Settings
Deposits of the Ciechocinek Formation are related to a brackish-marine origin, being deposited in an epicontinental sedimentary basin on Poland, that was the eastern arm of the Mid-European Toarcian Basin. Sedimentological analyses pointed to a deposition in a shallow basin, prevalently at deeper than 20 m, with present features of a large, shallow, brackish embayment. The Structure of the main depositional setting has been seen divided into three parts: on the center, near Kaszewy Kościelne there was a major restricted brackish-marine basin, with seasonal influxes of marine water. Around it, a series of restricted brackish-marine embayments were developed, leading to a transitional environment, formed by lagoons, dune barriers, delta fronts, delta plains and marshes, influenced by brackish-marine water. All of this was influenced by deltaic facies, that has its origin on marginal parts. Well preserved structural successions along the strata show that the depositional environment of the formation was strongly influenced by storm periods. During that storm periods, paleocurrents transported sand and other components from nearshore to distal settings, being after that reworked by waves and distributed along the sea floor, by several wave related flows. Distal settings show the influence of the storms with due to the presence of several laminated deposition of sand-silt streaks, cross-laminated silt, small sand lenses and interlaid mud-silt-sand heteroliths. Near settings are represented on the strata by several centimetre thick layers and sand packets, with several traces and sedimentary structures, such as wave parallel and crossbed ripple marks. Along this strata, trace fossils are deposited on settings where geochemical analyses show the presence of a brackish water influence on the basin. The main component of the deposits are muds,  intercalated sandstones and silts disposed on a high variety of structures, with at least twelve lithofacies that run from fine-grained sedimentation to wave-dominated sandy shoals. It is believed that the dominant sedimentation was by quiet mud and silt sedimentation from suspension, which probably come from near river mouths.  It was a sedimentary basin with a continuous influx of clay and fine silt, to which sand was brought by events such as river transportation, storms, eustatic effects, and other related. There is a detailed succession of changes in the strata with time, where the location of the river mouths shifted because of effects such as the progradation of deltas, the stopping of the flux of river channels and the long-lasting eustatic sea-level changes, all of that can be confirmed by the presence of microstructures as result of erosion and cross lamination in the mud-silt facies. A marine transgression correlated to the rise of the sea level on the Lower Toarcian is clearly visible on the Silesian-Cracow area, where the sea encroached the Polish Trough, which resulted in the end of the Pliensbachian alluvial sedimentation, that can be observed on the underlying Blanowice Formation. The presence of alluvial sedimentation still on the nearshore environments, as an effect probably related to floods. On some layers it was observed that the chemistry of the sea water was changing as the deposition continues on the most recent layers of the Ciechocinek Formation, implying the possible formation of a brackish environment, probably due to the sedimentation of fluvial currents. Most of the invertebrate traces reported from the formation, come from these layers. It contains  several marine dinoflagellate cysts, Foraminiferal linings and a relatively di verse trace fossil, such as Planolites, Palaeophycus, Helminthopsis, Gyrochorte, Protovirgularia, Spongeliomorpha and Diplocraterion associated with pyrite mineralization. On the upper levels of the formation there is a clear change in the sedimentation: a sea regression with a palatine alluvial progradation. The sea left seashore lakes, lagoons, deltas, mangroves, with the emergence of the land confirmed by the occurrence of plant roots and desiccation cracks. This is also shown on the changes on the fauna present, where the trace fossils get more abundant, specially Planolites and there is appearance of phyllopods of the genus Eustheria, reflecting decline in water salinity.

Profile

Economical Implications
Local Diagenetic processes were not sufficient to transform kaolinite, but it may have altered smectite and mixed-layers into illite and/or chlorite. The levels of clay from the lower part of the Ciechocinek Formation have real economic significance because of lithologic development and lower siderite content. This strata is filled with economic resources and reserves of raw materials that are good for building ceramics and some type of stoneware clays. Kaolinite varieties that can be made into ceramic raw materials can only be expected locally in regions where its content was additionally increased as a result of erosion and re-sedimentation of older (Pliensbachian specially) weathered covers. Due to the lower Toarcian global warming and dampening the climate enrichment with kaolinite was commonly seen in the upper part of the formation, but the periodic increase in progression had caused these deposits to left only silt and sandy heteroliths.

Sediments belonging to the formation on Mazovia have revealed potential (based on geological and geophysical data) to be  storage sites. Analysis done by previous Italian researchers found porosities in the range 1.53-11.56%. A single  heterolith of the Ciechocinek Formation yield values of 15.1% and 0.159 mD, respectively. Archival data for various sections of the Ciechocinek formation show porosity in the range of 3.67-22.59% and permeability from <0.1 to 50.92 mD. These levels are often barred by the existence of discontinuous deformations within the region very poor documentation of petrophysical properties of the system.

Paleoenvironment

Polish Coastal-Marine Basin
The Ciechocinek Formation on the Polish Basin mainly represents a large and shallow brackish embayment, with a lower part deposited in a restricted offshore environment, with lagoonal, deltaic and other seashore deposits, that translates to a deeper, nearly fully-marine environment in the Pomeranian region. Concretely the Ciechocinek Formation was a basin that covered the nearshore deposits of the Eastern and North Bohemian Massif and the southwest margin of Fennoscandia On Parkoszowice the shores of the Eastern Bohemian Massif ended on a large delta, where organic matter and trunks were deposited. This zone has more developed aquatic conditions with a marked marine influence, where the presence of a river coming from Czech Republic, as the organic matter that was translated to the shore was more probably derived from thermally mature sediments, Carboniferous strata present on the eastern margin of the massif. The Brody-Lubienia borehole represented the coastal section of the Fennoscandinavian shield, with also river deltas, but with a stronger terrestrial influence, and with the river eroded material coming from Ordovician/Silurian black shales from Lublin.

In the Polish basin, it has recently been found (based on studies of phytoclasts in terrigenous material) sharp negative anomalies (CIE) on the 13C curves, attesting to further episodes of gradually increasing warming. The presence of abundant clay on the marine deposits suggest a great flux of terrestrial facies. There is a significant diagenetic overprint (especially illitization of smectite), with burial depths up to 2000 m, with most of the studied sediments not been buried more than 1500–2000 m, which indicates that the Toarcian sediments weren't modified on a visible scale by thermal diagenesis. The kaolinite content of the strata on the formation is important, due to its resistance to diagenetic conditions, while on the Ciechocinek Deposits is observed that there wasn't enough diagenesis to transform the kaolinite into illite, with the clay minerals are detrital and the organic matter is very immature, as palynomorphs show low thermal action. This kaolinite was recovered mostly on the Brody-Lubenia borehole, set on the end of a large river system. On the Epicontinental Polish Basin, the Total organic carbon from the Toarcian Deposits lack connection with the Climate changes observed worldwide, with the organic carbon associated with the burial of terrestrial matter. The lower part of the Ciechocinek Formation show conditions of sediment burial, typical under moderate climate conditions, reflected by the reduction of carbon content due to the onset of warming, maybe related with the marine flooding due to the Early Toarcian transgression, reworking the swampy lowland deposits. During this stage there was a clear time of enhanced erosion and runoff, showed on surrounding landmasses, that result in the delivery of sediments with diverse mineralogies to the marine basin.

The presence of green facies in the modern Polish Realm is related to an ancient ironstone paleoenvironment, with shallow marine facies that show a decreasing presence of iron. The occurrence of this type of deposit in modern strata is related to intertropical regions in the vicinity of river mouths, where the clay mineral composition was moderately altered by the effects of local tectonic movements, sea-level changes, erosion, and recycling of ancient sediments or by hydraulic sorting during the transport and deposition. Those relations made attribute the strata to deposition on a warm and really humid climate, with dominant swampy or marshy environments, along brackish-marine environments, consisting of lagoons, embayments, estuaries, mangroves, low-energy deltas and near sand wave fields or barrier islands, similar to the modern Caribbean Sea islands and seashore environments.

The high presence of kaolinite on the strata of the formation suggest a biochemical weathering in tropical or humid-subtropical climate with perennial rainfall, as modern kaolinite deposits are typically present in humid jungle settings. Finds across Europe on Toarcian strata suggest that the formation of kaolinite in tropical soils and its deposition in marine sediments could be almost contemporaneous during the Early Jurassic in the Peritethyan Domain. On the Suliszowice borehole was recorded a gradual mineralogical change, while on the Mechowo borehole there is a clear oscillation of the kaolinite content, where is also recovered Milankovitch cycles, short climate variations due to the deposition of the kaolinite on sea facies, where a change on climate conditions led to increase locally erosion and rework of pre-Jurassic kaolinitic rocks. Decreasing kaolinite in the strata can suggest a hot but less humid climate. In the middle part of the Ciechocinek Formation, as exposure of the abundant amount of saolinite shows that was developed as a result of intense humidity of the environments, with the increasing presence of several fossils and minerals on the strata outside the measurements of the iron precipitation. Organic matter is of type III kerogen, with fragments of microscopic plants and several traces of organic matter. Fungal material is present, where is shown how an increase on the number of specimens can be linked to the climate change on the lower Toarcian. Beyond that, by the use of clay mineral data was possible to establish how the changes on the early Toarcian affected the Polish Basin: the increasing warming temperatures were measured by changes in the Kaolinite deposition on the Polish margin of the Formation, where is exposed that the subtropical climate of the region was affected by runoffs from the Tethyan realms, with the super-greenhouse/anoxic event linked to methane expulsion. There was a decline in rainfalls towards the Tenuicostatum-Falciferum boundary, exposing a transition to less humid conditions, noted by the decreasing amount of kaolinite.

Biota and wildfires

The Lublin Coal Basin Flora is the main discovery on the formation. Found on the Bogdanka Coal Mine on the L-95 borehole, it is dominated mainly by Bennettitales and Cycads, while  Ginkgo and Cheirolepidiaceae, are subordinate, same for ferns, where are found only large arboreal ones. The flora is above Carboniferous strata, with conservation status of Jurassic flora is clearly different and is also different than Świętokrzyskie flora (Hettangian). The flora has detritus, forming the main components of laminae in sandstones, along numerous lignites, that prove the occurrence of numerous fires locally.

The organic matter found includes the oldest known biomolecules (labdanoic acid, ferruginol, sugiol and 7-oxototarol) from the  "Blanowice brown coals", which probe the presence of abundant wildfires and/or peat fires on the formation, with the Cupressaceae and/or Podocarpaceae families the main peat-forming plant species. Posterior revision of the lignites of the brown coals had revealed a major distribution of benzohopane derivatives in these coals and surrounding sandstones, that implicate probable differences in the degree of biodegradation, and also a low coalification range, typical of lignites. Later larger studies show a really big influence of the fires on the region. After the Toarcian Anoxic Event on the called "Kaszewy-1" (where the Toarcian makes about 150 m of the strata) the wildfire activity was widely recorded. The great abundance of charcoal is the main indicator of the fire activity locally, but also the polycyclic aromatic hydrocarbons, whose abundance reflects an increase in wildfire activity. Coarse charcoal particle abundance is low, while the fine charcoal particles are more abundant on nearly all the measured samples, vinculated to small reductions of the sea level locally. The most abundant polycyclic Hhydrocarbon found locally is phenanthrene, and the charcoal data shows how the fires locally increased around the Carbon Isotope Excursion on the Toarcian Anoxic Event Worldwide. During this period, mostly of the strata of the region show at least six periods of fire intensification, that are coeval to others found in Yorkshire, Wales and Peniche.

Sporomorphs have been found, with Minerisporites richardsoni as one of the most abundant, being a genus related to Isoëtaceae. Other examples of flora include ferns, bennettitales and cycads. On the recent layers there are more flora as a response to the fall of the sea level, with the presence of larger wood fragments, up to 1 m long, along with trunks. There is a high dominance of spores in the whole Polish Basin observed in the Lower Toarcian strata, with an average only 20% of bisaccate pollen grains against 80% of spores, contrasting with the other strata from older intervals of the Early Jurassic. The presence of abundant spores is related to palaeoclimatic factors, as sediments show that the climate at that time was much warmer and much more humid (with a small exception on the Tenuicostatum biochronozone) than in the Hettangian-Pliensbachian interval. The bisaccate pollen grain/spore ratio in the Lower Toarcian deposits in Poland is always strongly biased towards spores, which dominate even in the brackish-offshore settings.  The dominance of spores was probably associated with regional climate fluctuations, associated with proximity of the West European Sea in Pomerania, and  more continental climate related to higher altitudes in the east. These finds are related with the pollen and plant remains found on the Chinese Hsiangchi Formation (Also Toarcian), pointing to a warm and humid climate, that changed after to a  drier conditions, as observed on the Quaidam Basin.

Marine-Deltaic German realm
The setting of the Ciechocinek Formation jumps from a marginal marine deposition on th older sediments to a delta front on its younger layers. The lower Toarcian interval mainly consists of fine-grained sand that passes upwards into black bituminous, laminated silty clay and pure clay, reflecting a retrograding nearshore depositional environment, where the marine settings were reduced and the freshwater influence grown. The uppermost section, referred to me Bifrons-Thoaurense zone is composed by fine-grained sand with clay streaks, deposited very likely on a growing deltaic system, as plant remains (specially  equisetalean stem referred to Neocalamites sp. and fossil wood of coniferous origin, probably Cheirolepidiaceae or Araucariaceae) increase dramatically, which probes a decrease of the nearby marine water depths with a progadation of the delta front coming from the north, from the Fennoscandian mainland. In a wider palaeogeographical scope, sediment and terrestrial biota clearly originate from the southern margin of Fennoscandia, where the eroding rim of the crystalline Proterozoic craton delivered large amounts of material. These formed a clastic fringe of deltaic and alluvial plains along the southern coast of Fennoscandia. The clay dominated settings of the Ciechocinek Formation where deposited on a restricted basin, with absence of major ripples and wavy undultion that discards the influence of wave action. The lateral equivalent of Poland represents a shallow, brackish-marine accumulation with more humid conditions, as the dominating miospore is the genus Paxillitriletes phyllicus (Isoetales), indicating a climatic change from moderate and relatively dry to warm and humid in the early Toarcian on the Polish Basin. This is different on the Ciechocinek Formation at Grimmen, as the dominant palynoflora is composed by Inaperturopollenites (Cupressaceae or Pinaceae), and abundant Spheripollenites & Classopollis (Cheirolepidiaceae). This palynological record matches with the data of the sister Sorthat Formation Toarcian levels, where Spheripollenites comprises the 95% of the palynoflora, along the cheirolepidaceous cuticle Dactyletrophyllum ramonensis and the peak of the Pagiophyllum leaves, indicators of semidesertic to Mediterranean climates, implying an abrupt warming event. The water environments were characterised by a lack of benthic fauna, with only a few annelid traces and crustacean molts, where bivalves are limited to  Parainoceramya dubia and abundance of the holoplanktokic gastropod Coelodiscus minutus, with serious lack of stenohaline fauna, from echinoderms to belemnnites. This, along with the enormous abundance of phyllopods indicate strong freshwater influence of the coeval developing delta from the north, specially on the Bifrons-onwards section. The vertebrate fauna is dominated by actinopterygian fishes (specially Leptolepidae) followed by marine reptiles. They occur alongside an extraordinary rich fauna of terrestrial insects, as well spider and dinosaur remains, indicating the presence of suitable terrestrial environments nearby.

The large Toarcian–Bajocian deltaic systems locally meet the shoreline here, influenced by the vicinity between brackish to freshwater and continental biofacies. The North German Basin shows that on approximately 14.4 m.a, four third-order relative sea-level fluctuations led the subsequent formation of four individual delta generations in the Bifrons-Thouarsense (Toarcian), Murchisonae-Bradfordensis (Aalenian) and  Humpresianum-Garatiana (Bajocian). The Toarcian section was dominated by regressive elongated river-dominated deltas, were due to the fall of the sea level the south to southwest directed delta progradation between the Lower-Upper Toarcian, that was deposited as 40 m of deltaic successions, found on places like Prignitz (East) and Brandenburg (North). On the Bifrons zone (180.36-178.24 m.a) to the Thouarense zone (176.23-174.97 m.a) there was the final outbuilding of the local delta plains, where there was a stretching of about 200 km from the northern margins of the basin to the center. The Upper deltaic plains lack any marine influence, with biofacies composed mostly by palynomorphs, where in the southwest the lower part of the plains shows the influence of temporal marine incursions. The lower plain of the delta covered approx. 10,000 km2 (Bifrons). The deltas were connected with several networks of delatic channel belts, where on zones like Usedom (northeast) there is a clear path with bifurcations and reunification of the channel belts. On the lower delta plain lithofacies plant detritus and wood debris are very common, deposited probably on interdistributary bays formed embayments, thanks to overbank flooding from near distributaries, that covered approx. 2000 km2 (Bifrons). Then, on the Thouarsense, resulted in the final outbuilding of delta plains stretching about 200 km from northern basin margins to the basin centre, with lower delta plains reaching . Detritus was introduced to these bays from neighbouring distributaries due to overbank flooding, crevassing and/or avulsion.

Paleofauna 

Insects are abundant on the German realm, including collections of up to 3000 specimens. The German realm has a boundary composed of bituminous shale, representing an ancient seashore-influenced environment, probably lagoonal, and contemporaneous with the Posidonia Shale and specifically the Sorthat Formation of the same region. Fossil wood has been found on the same location, including driftwood and other related to the Araucariaceae, present in other European environments of Toarcian age. Of the invertebrate fauna, insects, bivalves, sea snails and ammonites (genus Tiltoniceras, Eleganticeras and Lobolytoceras) have been found. The vertebrate fauna is also varied, with fossils of the fish genus Saurorhynchus, and the new genus Grimmenichthys and Grimmenodon. Reptile fossils include Ichthyosauria indet., indeterminate Plesiosauria, rhomaleosaurid plesiosaurs, indeterminate Mesoeucrocodylia (probably related with Sichuanosuchus), indeterminate Thalattosuchia, the basal thyreophoran Emausaurus, a theropod and gravisaurian sauropod material, related with the north African Tazoudasaurus.

On the Polish realm the fauna is represented by Conchostracans, rare Foraminifera and scarce Ostracoda as the main components, with occasional undetermined bivalves, gastropods and fish teeth and scales. These layers are abundant in ichnospecies of invertebrate fauna, including mostly marine organisms, such as Planolites (Worm-like animals), Palaeophycus (Polychaeta), Protovirgularia (Nuculoidea) and Spongeliomorpha (Decapoda).

See also 
 List of fossiliferous stratigraphic units in Germany
 List of fossiliferous stratigraphic units in Poland
 Toarcian turnover
 Toarcian formations

 Marne di Monte Serrone, Italy
 Calcare di Sogno, Italy
 Mizur Formation, North Caucasus
 Irlbach Sandstone, Germany
 Sachrang Formation, Austria
 Saubach Formation, Austria
 Blanowice Formation, Southern Poland
 Krempachy Marl Formation, Poland and Slovakia
 Djupadal Formation, Central Skane
 Lava Formation, Lithuania
 Azilal Group, North Africa
 Whitby Mudstone, England
 Fernie Formation and Poker Chip Shale, Alberta and British Columbia
 Whiteaves Formation, British Columbia
 Navajo Sandstone, Utah
 Los Molles Formation, Argentina
 Mawson Formation, Antarctica
 Kandreho Formation, Madagascar
 Kota Formation, India
 Cattamarra Coal Measures, Australia

References 

Geologic formations of Germany
Geologic formations of Poland
Toarcian Stage
Jurassic System of Europe
Jurassic Germany
Mudstone formations
Sandstone formations
Source rock formations
Deltaic deposits
Lagoonal deposits
Shallow marine deposits
Fossiliferous stratigraphic units of Europe
Paleontology in Germany
Paleontology in Poland